Falkenberg is a village and a former municipality in the district of Stendal, in Saxony-Anhalt, Germany. Since 1 January 2010, it is part of the municipality Altmärkische Wische.

People from Falkenberg 
 Friedrich Wilhelm von Bülow (1755-1816), Prussian general
 Dietrich Heinrich von Bülow (1757-1807), Prussian  soldier and military writer

Former municipalities in Saxony-Anhalt
Altmärkische Wische